Yichang, alternatively romanized as Ichang, is a prefecture-level city located in western Hubei province, China. It is the third largest city in the province after the capital, Wuhan and the prefecture-level city Xiangyang, by urban population. The Three Gorges Dam is located within its administrative area, in Yiling District.

History
In ancient times Yichang was known as Yiling. Historical records indicate that in the year 278 BC, during the Warring States period, the Qin general Bai Qi set fire to Yiling. In 222 AD Yichang was also the site of the Battle of Yiling, during the Three Kingdoms Period.

Under the Qing Guangxu Emperor, Yichang was opened to foreign commerce as a trading port after the Qing and Great Britain agreed to the Chefoo Convention, which was signed by Sir Thomas Wade and Li Hongzhang in Chefoo on 21 August 1876. The imperial government set up a navigation company there and began building facilities. Since 1949, more than 50 wharves (with a total combined length of over ) have been constructed at the port.

During the Second Sino-Japanese War, Yichang was a primary supply depot for the defending Chinese army. In October 1938, as the Japanese moved up the Yangtze River towards the strategic city of Chongqing, it became clear that Yichang needed to be evacuated. In 40 days, under the direction of businessman Lu Zuofu, more than 100,000 tons of equipment and 30,000 personnel were transported upstream by steamship or by porters pulling smaller vessels through the Three Gorges rapids to Chongqing.

In 1940, the Battle of Zaoyang-Yichang took place in the area.

Administrative divisions
Administratively, it is a prefecture-level city; its municipal government has jurisdiction over five counties, five urban districts, and three satellite county-level cities (Yidu, Dangyang, Zhijiang).

 Xiling District - includes the city center
 Wujiagang District - southeastern parts of the urban area and suburbs
 Dianjun District - the part of the urban area southwest of the Yangtze (across from the city center) and suburbs
 Xiaoting District
 Yiling District - northern part of the urban area and suburbs
 Zhijiang City
 Yidu City
 Dangyang City
 Yuan'an County
 Xingshan County
 Changyang Tujia Autonomous County
 Wufeng Tujia Autonomous County

Administrative map
The prefecture-level city of Yichang has direct jurisdiction over 14 divisions: 5 districts, 3 county-level cities, 3 counties, and 3 autonomous counties.:

Geography
Like most prefecture-level cities, Yichang includes both an urban area (which is labeled on less detailed maps as "Yichang") and the surrounding country area. The Xiling Gorge, the easternmost of the Three Gorges on the Yangtze, is located within the prefecture-level city.

Within the prefecture-level city of Yichang, the Yangtze is joined by a number of tributaries, including the Qing River (right), Xiang Xi and Huangbo Rivers (left).

The central urban area of Yichang is split between several districts. On the right (northeastern) bank of the Yangtze are located Xiling District (where the city center is located), Yiling District (neighborhoods north of the center) and Wujiagang District (southern area). The city area on the opposite (southeastern) bank of the river is included into Dianjun District. All these districts, with the exception of the central Xiling, also include a fair amount of suburban/rural area outside of the city urban core.

Climate
Yichang has a four-season, monsoon-influenced, humid subtropical climate (Köppen Cwa), with cool, damp and generally overcast winters, and hot, humid summers. Close to 70% of the annual precipitation of  occurs from May to September. With monthly percent possible sunshine ranging from 24% in January to 49% in August, the city receives 1,568 hours of bright sunshine annually, and summer is the sunniest season.

Transport

By Plane

The airport  is conveniently located, which borders Yihuang Highway in the north, Long River Golden Waterway in the south and Jiaozhi Railway in the east.

Roads and bridges

 China National Highway 318 runs east–west through most of the prefecture-level city, south of the center city
 China National Highway 209 passes through the northwestern corner of the prefecture-level city (Xingshan County)
Several provincial highways connect Yichang center city with most counties.

Several bridges span the Yangtze River within the prefecture-level city of Yichang, including (upstream to downstream):
 Xiling Bridge, connecting Letianxi and Sandouping in Yiling District, a few km downstream from the Three Gorges Dam.
 Yiling Bridge, downtown Yichang (a few km downstream from the Gezhouba Dam). It connects the urban Xiling and Dianjun Districts.
 Yichang Yangtze Highway Bridge, on the Hu-Rong Expressway, downstream of Yichang center city
 Yiwan Bridge: A Railway Bridge for Yiwan Railway which connects Yichang to Chongqing by high speed trains, almost downstream from the Yiling Bridge.

There are several ferry crossings as well.

Waterways

Yichang is an important river port on the Yangtze river. Maoping Town (the county seat of Zigui County), has an active passenger wharf as well.

The Qing River in the southern part of the prefecture, with its cascade of dams, is an important waterway as well.

Railway
Yichang is served by several railway lines.

Yichang Railway Station, located in downtown Yichang, opened in 1971, was the city's first railway station. In 2012 it closed for a renovation project.

The Yichang East Railway Station, opened in the late 2010 in the eastern suburbs of Yichang, is presently the city's main train station. It is the junction point of two segments of the Shanghai-Wuhan-Chengdu Passenger Dedicated Line, one of China's new east–west rail mainlines. To the east, the Hanyi Railway  (opened June 29, 2012) provides frequent service to Wuhan, with some trains continuing to Nanjing and Shanghai. To the west, the Yiwan Railway (Yichang-Wanzhou; opened December 2010) serves as the gateway to Hubei's southwestern panhandle (Enshi), with some service continuing to Chongqing and Chengdu.

The Jiaozuo–Liuzhou Railway, a north–south line, crosses the eastern part of the prefecture-level city. It crosses the Yangtze at Zhicheng in Yidu County-level City.

Demographics

As of the 2020 census, its population was 4,017,607 inhabitants of whom 1,536,012 lived in the built-up (or metro) area consisting of Yiling, Xiling, Wujiagang and Dianjun urban districts. The Xiaoting District has not yet been urbanized. Yichang prefecture-level city, is home to many members of the Tujia ethnic group, who mostly live in several counties in the south-west of the prefecture.

Yichang also formed the border between the cultures of Ba in the west (an ancient state in the eastern part of what is now Sichuan Province) and the Chu State in the east (an ancient state in what is now Hubei Province and northern Hunan Province).

Education
Since 2002, Yichang City has been home of the China Three Gorges University (the result of the merger of the University of Hydraulic & Electric Engineering, Yichang and of Hubei Sanxia University), the largest comprehensive university in Hubei Province outside Wuhan, with over 20,400 full-time students.

China Three Gorges University
Three Gorges Vocational College of Electric Power 
There are 170 secondary schools in Yichang enrolling 150,700 students. 53,900 of the citizens in Yichang hold a secondary school degree. There are 282 elementary schools being located in Yichang enrolling 156,900. 27,600 of the citizens hold secondary school degrees. 383 kindergartens located in Yichang with 78,500 children.

Economy
Yichang has long been a major transit port and distribution center of goods, and serves as the economic hub of western Hubei province and an intermediary between the major cities of Chongqing and Wuhan. Its primary industries are shipping and shipbuilding, taking advantage of its location on the Yangtze River.

Yichang prefecture is the site of many major hydroelectricity projects.
The Geheyan Dam and Gaobazhou Dam on the Qing River are important as well. Besides those, a huge number of medium-sized and small power plants operate on smaller rivers and streams within the prefecture.

Picture gallery

See also
List of twin towns and sister cities in China

References

Further reading
Report on the Physical, Commercial, Social and General Conditions of Ichang and Neighborhood. H. A. Little. (Diplo. and Cons. Rpts. [London], Misc. Ser., 1908, No. 671, p. 24).— C. F. Langworthy.

External links

 Official website of Yichang Government - English version 

 
Cities in Hubei
Populated places on the Yangtze River
Prefecture-level divisions of Hubei